British Rail Class 93 may refer to:
British Rail Class 93 (InterCity 250), an unbuilt locomotive type, planned by British Rail for the West Coast Main Line .
British Rail Class 93 (Stadler), an upcoming tri-mode locomotive to be built by Stadler Rail in Valencia.